Acid rain is rain or any other form of precipitation that is unusually acidic, meaning that it has elevated levels of hydrogen ions (low pH). Most water, including drinking water, has a neutral pH that exists between 6.5 and 8.5, but acid rain has a pH level lower than this and ranges from 4–5 on average. The more acidic the acid rain is, the lower its pH is. Acid rain can have harmful effects on plants, aquatic animals, and infrastructure. Acid rain is caused by emissions of sulfur dioxide and nitrogen oxide, which react with the water molecules in the atmosphere to produce acids.

Acid rain has been shown to have adverse impacts on forests, freshwaters, soils, microbes, insects and aquatic life-forms. In ecosystems, persistent acid rain reduces tree bark durability, leaving flora more susceptible to environmental stressors such as drought, heat/cold and pest infestation. Acid rain is also capable of detrimenting soil composition by stripping it of nutrients such as calcium and magnesium which play a role in plant growth and maintaining healthy soil. In terms of human infrastructure, acid rain also causes paint to peel, corrosion of steel structures such as bridges, and weathering of stone buildings and statues as well as having impacts on human health.

Some governments, including those in Europe and North America, have made efforts since the 1970s to reduce the release of sulfur dioxide and nitrogen oxide into the atmosphere through air pollution regulations. These efforts have had positive results due to the widespread research on acid rain starting in the 1960s and the publicized information on its harmful effects. The main source of sulfur and nitrogen compounds that result in acid rain are anthropogenic, but nitrogen oxides can also be produced naturally by lightning strikes and sulphur dioxide is produced by volcanic eruptions.

Definition
"Acid rain" is a popular term referring to the deposition of a mixture from wet (rain, snow, sleet, fog,  cloudwater, and dew) and dry (acidifying particles and gases) acidic components. Distilled water, once carbon dioxide is removed, has a neutral pH of 7. Liquids with a pH less than 7 are acidic, and those with a pH greater than 7 are alkaline. "Clean" or unpolluted rain has an acidic pH, but usually no lower than 5.7, because carbon dioxide and water in the air react together to form carbonic acid, a weak acid according to the following reaction:

Carbonic acid then can ionize in water forming low concentrations of carbonate and hydronium ions:

Unpolluted rain can also contain other chemicals which affect its pH (acidity level). A common example is nitric acid produced by electric discharge in the atmosphere such as lightning.

Occasional pH readings in rain and fog water of well below 2.4 have been reported in industrialized areas.

History

Acid rain was first systematically studied in Europe, in the 1960s, and in the United States and Canada, the following decade.

In Europe

The corrosive effect of polluted, acidic city air on limestone and marble was noted in the 17th century by John Evelyn, who remarked upon the poor condition of the Arundel marbles.
Since the Industrial Revolution, emissions of sulfur dioxide and nitrogen oxides into the atmosphere have increased. In 1852, Robert Angus Smith was the first to show the relationship between acid rain and atmospheric pollution in Manchester, England. Smith coined the term "acid rain" in 1872.

In the late 1960s, scientists began widely observing and studying the phenomenon. At first, the main focus in this research lay on local effects of acid rain. Waldemar Christofer Brøgger was the first to acknowledge long-distance transportation of pollutants crossing borders from the United Kingdom to Norway – a problem systematically studied by Brynjulf Ottar in the 1970s. Ottar's work was strongly influenced by Swedish soil scientist Svante Odén, who had drawn widespread attention to Europe's acid rain problem in popular newspapers and wrote a landmark paper on the subject in 1968.

In the United States

The earliest report about acid rain in the United States came from chemical evidence gathered from Hubbard Brook Valley; public awareness of acid rain in the US increased in the 1970s after The New York Times reported on these findings.

In 1972, a group of scientists including Gene Likens discovered the rain that was deposited at White Mountains of New Hampshire was acidic. The pH of the sample was measured to be 4.03 at Hubbard Brook. The Hubbard Brook Ecosystem Study followed up with a series of research studies that analyzed the environmental effects of acid rain. Acid rain that mixed with stream water at Hubbard Brook was neutralized by the alumina from soils. The result of this research indicated that the chemical reaction between acid rain and aluminum leads to an increasing rate of soil weathering. Experimental research was done to examine the effects of increased acidity in streams on ecological species. In 1980, a group of scientists modified the acidity of Norris Brook, New Hampshire, and observed the change in species' behaviors. There was a decrease in species diversity, an increase in community dominants, and a decrease in the food web complexity.

In 1980, the US Congress passed an Acid Deposition Act. This Act established an 18-year assessment and research program under the direction of the National Acidic Precipitation Assessment Program (NAPAP). NAPAP enlarged a network of monitoring sites to determine how acidic the precipitation actually was, seeking to determine long-term trends, and established a network for dry deposition. Using a statistically based sampling design, NAPAP quantified the effects of acid rain on a regional basis by targeting research and surveys to identify and quantify the effects of acid precipitation on freshwater and terrestrial ecosystems. NAPAP also assessed the effects of acid rain on historical buildings, monuments, and building materials. It also funded extensive studies on atmospheric processes and potential control programs.

From the start, policy advocates from all sides attempted to influence NAPAP activities to support their particular policy advocacy efforts, or to disparage those of their opponents.  For the US Government's scientific enterprise, a significant impact of NAPAP were lessons learned in the assessment process and in environmental research management to a relatively large group of scientists, program managers, and the public.

In 1981, the National Academy of Sciences was looking into research about the controversial issues regarding acid rain. President Ronald Reagan dismissed the issues of acid rain until his personal visit to Canada and confirmed that the Canadian border suffered from the drifting pollution from smokestacks originating in the US Midwest. Reagan honored the agreement to Canadian Prime Minister Pierre Trudeau's enforcement of anti-pollution regulation. In 1982, Reagan commissioned William Nierenberg to serve on the National Science Board. Nierenberg selected scientists including Gene Likens to serve on a panel to draft a report on acid rain. In 1983, the panel of scientists came up with a draft report, which concluded that acid rain is a real problem and solutions should be sought. White House Office of Science and Technology Policy reviewed the draft report and sent Fred Singer's suggestions of the report, which cast doubt on the cause of acid rain. The panelists revealed rejections against Singer's positions and submitted the report to Nierenberg in April. In May 1983, the House of Representatives voted against legislation that aimed to control sulfur emissions. There was a debate about whether Nierenberg delayed to release the report. Nierenberg himself denied the saying about his suppression of the report and stated that the report was withheld after the House's vote because it was not ready to be published.

In 1991, the US National Acid Precipitation Assessment Program (NAPAP) provided its first assessment of acid rain in the United States. It reported that 5% of New England Lakes were acidic, with sulfates being the most common problem. They noted that 2% of the lakes could no longer support Brook Trout, and 6% of the lakes were unsuitable for the survival of many species of minnow. Subsequent Reports to Congress have documented chemical changes in soil and freshwater ecosystems, nitrogen saturation, decreases in amounts of nutrients in soil, episodic acidification, regional haze, and damage to historical monuments.

Meanwhile, in 1990, the US Congress passed a series of amendments to the Clean Air Act. Title IV of these amendments established a cap and trade system designed to control emissions of sulfur dioxide and nitrogen oxides. Title IV called for a total reduction of about 10 million tons of SO2 emissions from power plants, close to a 50% reduction. It was implemented in two phases. Phase I began in 1995, and limited sulfur dioxide emissions from 110 of the largest power plants to a combined total of 8.7 million tons of sulfur dioxide. One power plant in New England (Merrimack) was in Phase I. Four other plants (Newington, Mount Tom, Brayton Point, and Salem Harbor) were added under other provisions of the program. Phase II began in 2000, and affects most of the power plants in the country.

During the 1990s, research continued. On March 10, 2005, the EPA issued the Clean Air Interstate Rule (CAIR). This rule provides states with a solution to the problem of power plant pollution that drifts from one state to another. CAIR will permanently cap emissions of SO2 and NOx in the eastern United States. When fully implemented, CAIR will reduce SO2 emissions in 28 eastern states and the District of Columbia by over 70% and NOx emissions by over 60% from 2003 levels.

Overall, the program's cap and trade program has been successful in achieving its goals. Since the 1990s, SO2 emissions have dropped 40%, and according to the Pacific Research Institute, acid rain levels have dropped 65% since 1976. Conventional regulation was used in the European Union, which saw a decrease of over 70% in SO2 emissions during the same time period.

In 2007, total SO2 emissions were 8.9 million tons, achieving the program's long-term goal ahead of the 2010 statutory deadline.

In 2007 the EPA estimated that by 2010, the overall costs of complying with the program for businesses and consumers would be $1 billion to $2 billion a year, only one fourth of what was originally predicted. Forbes says: "In 2010, by which time the cap and trade system had been augmented by the George W. Bush administration's Clean Air Interstate Rule, SO2 emissions had fallen to 5.1 million tons."

The term citizen science can be traced back as far as January 1989 to a campaign by the Audubon Society to measure acid rain. Scientist Muki Haklay cites in a policy report for the Wilson Center entitled 'Citizen Science and Policy: A European Perspective' a first use of the term 'citizen science' by R. Kerson in the magazine MIT Technology Review from January 1989. Quoting from the Wilson Center report: "The new form of engagement in science received the name "citizen science". The first recorded example of the use of the term is from 1989, describing how 225 volunteers across the US collected rain samples to assist the Audubon Society in an acid-rain awareness raising campaign. The volunteers collected samples, checked for acidity, and reported back to the organization. The information was then used to demonstrate the full extent of the phenomenon."

In Canada 

Canadian Harold Harvey was among the first to research a "dead" lake. In 1971, he and R.J. Beamish published a report, "Acidification of the La Cloche Mountain Lakes", documenting the gradual deterioration of fish stocks in 60 lakes in Killarney Park in Ontario, which they had been studying systematically since 1966.

In the 1970s and 80s, acid rain was a major topic of research at the Experimental Lakes Area (ELA) in Northwestern Ontario, Canada. Researchers added sulfuric acid to whole lakes in controlled ecosystem experiments to simulate the effects of acid rain. Because its remote conditions allowed for whole-ecosystem experiments, research at the ELA showed that the effect of acid rain on fish populations started at concentrations much lower than those observed in laboratory experiments. In the context of a food web, fish populations crashed earlier than when acid rain had direct toxic effects to the fish because the acidity led to crashes in prey populations (e.g. mysids). As experimental acid inputs were reduced, fish populations and lake ecosystems recovered at least partially, although invertebrate populations have still not completely returned to the baseline conditions. This research showed both that acidification was linked to declining fish populations and that the effects could be reversed if sulfuric acid emissions decreased, and influenced policy in Canada and the United States.

In 1985, seven Canadian provinces (all except British Columbia, Alberta, and Saskatchewan) and the federal government signed the Eastern Canada Acid Rain Program. The provinces agreed to limit their combined sulfur dioxide emissions to 2.3 million tonnes by 1994. The Canada-US Air Quality Agreement was signed in 1991. In 1998, all federal, provincial, and territorial Ministers of Energy and Environment signed The Canada-Wide Acid Rain Strategy for Post-2000, which was designed to protect lakes that are more sensitive than those protected by earlier policies.

Emissions of chemicals leading to acidification
The most important gas which leads to acidification is sulfur dioxide. Emissions of nitrogen oxides which are oxidized to form nitric acid are of increasing importance due to stricter controls on emissions of sulfur compounds. 70 Tg(S) per year in the form of SO2 comes from fossil fuel combustion and industry, 2.8 Tg(S) from wildfires, and 7–8 Tg(S) per year from volcanoes.

Natural phenomena
The principal natural phenomena that contribute acid-producing gases to the atmosphere are emissions from volcanoes. Thus, for example, fumaroles from the Laguna Caliente crater of Poás Volcano create extremely high amounts of acid rain and fog, with acidity as high as a pH of 2, clearing an area of any vegetation and frequently causing irritation to the eyes and lungs of inhabitants in nearby settlements. Acid-producing gasses are also created by biological processes that occur on the land, in wetlands, and in the oceans. The major biological source of sulfur compounds is dimethyl sulfide.

Nitric acid in rainwater is an important source of fixed nitrogen for plant life, and is also produced by electrical activity in the atmosphere such as lightning.

Acidic deposits have been detected in glacial ice thousands of years old in remote parts of the globe.

Human activity

The principal cause of acid rain is sulfur and nitrogen compounds from human sources, such as electricity generation, animal agriculture, factories, and motor vehicles. Industrial acid rain is a substantial problem in China and Russia and areas downwind from them. These areas all burn sulfur-containing coal to generate heat and electricity.

The problem of acid rain has not only increased with population and industrial growth, but has become more widespread. The use of tall smokestacks to reduce local pollution has contributed to the spread of acid rain by releasing gases into regional atmospheric circulation; dispersal from these taller stacks causes pollutants to be carried farther, causing widespread ecological damage. Often deposition occurs a considerable distance downwind of the emissions, with mountainous regions tending to receive the greatest deposition (because of their higher rainfall). An example of this effect is the low pH of rain which falls in Scandinavia.

Chemical processes
Combustion of fuels produces sulfur dioxide and nitric oxides. They are converted into sulfuric acid and nitric acid.

Gas phase chemistry
In the gas phase sulfur dioxide is oxidized by reaction with the hydroxyl radical via an intermolecular reaction:
SO2 + OH· → HOSO2·
which is followed by:
HOSO2· + O2 → HO2· + SO3
In the presence of water, sulfur trioxide (SO3) is converted rapidly to sulfuric acid:
SO3 (g) + H2O (l) → H2SO4 (aq)

Nitrogen dioxide reacts with OH to form nitric acid:

NO2 + OH· → HNO3

Chemistry in cloud droplets
When clouds are present, the loss rate of SO2 is faster than can be explained by gas phase chemistry alone. This is due to reactions in the liquid water droplets.

Hydrolysis

Sulfur dioxide dissolves in water and then, like carbon dioxide, hydrolyses in a series of equilibrium reactions:

SO2 (g) + H2O  SO2·H2O
SO2·H2O  H+ + HSO3−
HSO3−  H+ + SO32−

Oxidation

There are a large number of aqueous reactions that oxidize sulfur from S(IV) to S(VI), leading to the formation of sulfuric acid. The most important oxidation reactions are with ozone, hydrogen peroxide and oxygen (reactions with oxygen are catalyzed by iron and manganese in the cloud droplets).

Acid deposition

Wet deposition
Wet deposition of acids occurs when any form of precipitation (rain, snow, and so on) removes acids from the atmosphere and delivers it to the Earth's surface. This can result from the deposition of acids produced in the raindrops (see aqueous phase chemistry above) or by the precipitation removing the acids either in clouds or below clouds. Wet removal of both gases and aerosols are both of importance for wet deposition.

Dry deposition
Acid deposition also occurs via dry deposition in the absence of precipitation. This can be responsible for as much as 20 to 60% of total acid deposition. This occurs when particles and gases stick to the ground, plants or other surfaces.

Adverse effects
Acid rain has been shown to have adverse impacts on forests, freshwaters and soils, killing insect and aquatic life-forms as well as causing damage to buildings and having impacts on human health.

Surface waters and aquatic animals

Both the lower pH and higher aluminium concentrations in surface water that occur as a result of acid rain can cause damage to fish and other aquatic animals. At pH lower than 5 most fish eggs will not hatch and lower pH can kill adult fish. As lakes and rivers become more acidic biodiversity is reduced. Acid rain has eliminated insect life and some fish species, including the brook trout in some lakes, streams, and creeks in geographically sensitive areas, such as the Adirondack Mountains of the United States. However, the extent to which acid rain contributes directly or indirectly via runoff from the catchment to lake and river acidity (i.e., depending on characteristics of the surrounding watershed) is variable. The United States Environmental Protection Agency's (EPA) website states: "Of the lakes and streams surveyed, acid rain caused acidity in 75% of the acidic lakes and about 50% of the acidic streams". Lakes hosted by silicate basement rocks are more acidic than lakes within limestone or other basement rocks with a carbonate composition (i.e. marble) due to buffering effects by carbonate minerals, even with the same amount of acid rain.

Soils
Soil biology and chemistry can be seriously damaged by acid rain. Some microbes are unable to tolerate changes to low pH and are killed. The enzymes of these microbes are denatured (changed in shape so they no longer function) by the acid. The hydronium ions of acid rain also mobilize toxins, such as aluminium, and leach away essential nutrients and minerals such as magnesium.

2 H+ (aq) + Mg2+ (clay)  2 H+ (clay) + Mg2+ (aq)

Soil chemistry can be dramatically changed when base cations, such as calcium and magnesium, are leached by acid rain, thereby affecting sensitive species, such as sugar maple (Acer saccharum).

Soil acidification

Impacts of acidic water and Soil acidification on plants could be minor or in most cases major. Most minor cases which do not result in fatality of plant life can be attributed to the plants being less susceptible to acidic conditions and/or the acid rain being less potent. However, even in minor cases, the plant will eventually die due to the acidic water lowering the plant's natural pH. Acidic water enters the plant and causes important plant minerals to dissolve and get carried away; which ultimately causes the plant to die of lack of minerals for nutrition. In major cases, which are more extreme, the same process of damage occurs as in minor cases, which is removal of essential minerals, but at a much quicker rate. Likewise, acid rain that falls on soil and on plant leaves causes drying of the waxy leaf cuticle, which ultimately causes rapid water loss from the plant to the outside atmosphere and eventually results in death of the plant. To see if a plant is being affected by soil acidification, one can closely observe the plant leaves. If the leaves are green and look healthy, the soil pH is normal and acceptable for plant life. But if the plant leaves have yellowing between the veins on their leaves, that means the plant is suffering from acidification and is unhealthy. Moreover, a plant suffering from soil acidification cannot photosynthesize; the acid-water-induced process of drying out of the plant can destroy chloroplast organelles. Without being able to photosynthesize, a plant cannot create nutrients for its own survival or oxygen for the survival of aerobic organisms, which affects most species on Earth and ultimately ends the purpose of the plant's existence.

Forests and other vegetation

Adverse effects may be indirectly related to acid rain, like the acid's effects on soil (see above) or high concentration of gaseous precursors to acid rain. High altitude forests are especially vulnerable as they are often surrounded by clouds and fog which are more acidic than rain.

Other plants can also be damaged by acid rain, but the effect on food crops is minimized by the application of lime and fertilizers to replace lost nutrients. In cultivated areas, limestone may also be added to increase the ability of the soil to keep the pH stable, but this tactic is largely unusable in the case of wilderness lands. When calcium is leached from the needles of red spruce, these trees become less cold tolerant and exhibit winter injury and even death.

Ocean acidification

Acid rain has a much less harmful effect on oceans on a global scale, but it creates an amplified impact in the shallower waters of coastal waters. Acid rain can cause the ocean's pH to fall, known as ocean acidification, making it more difficult for different coastal species to create their exoskeletons that they need to survive. These coastal species link together as part of the ocean's food chain, and without them being a source for other marine life to feed off of, more marine life will die. Coral's limestone skeleton is particularly sensitive to pH decreases, because the calcium carbonate, a core component of the limestone skeleton, dissolves in acidic (low pH) solutions.

In addition to acidification, excess nitrogen inputs from the atmosphere promote increased growth of phytoplankton and other marine plants, which, in turn, may cause more frequent harmful algal blooms and eutrophication (the creation of oxygen-depleted "dead zones") in some parts of the ocean.

Human health effects
Acid rain does not directly affect human health. The acid in the rainwater is too dilute to have direct adverse effects. The particulates responsible for acid rain (sulfur dioxide and nitrogen oxides) do have an adverse effect. Increased amounts of fine particulate matter in the air contribute to heart and lung problems, including asthma and bronchitis.

Other adverse effects

Acid rain can damage buildings, historic monuments, and statues, especially those made of rocks, such as limestone and marble, that contain large amounts of calcium carbonate. Acids in the rain react with the calcium compounds in the stones to create gypsum, which then flakes off.

CaCO3 (s) + H2SO4 (aq)  CaSO4 (s) + CO2 (g) + H2O (l)

The effects of this are commonly seen on old gravestones, where acid rain can cause the inscriptions to become completely illegible. Acid rain also increases the corrosion rate of metals, in particular iron, steel, copper and bronze.

Affected areas
Places significantly impacted by acid rain around the globe include most of eastern Europe from Poland northward into Scandinavia, the eastern third of the United States, and southeastern Canada. Other affected areas include the southeastern coast of China and Taiwan.

Prevention methods

Technical solutions
Many coal-firing power stations use flue-gas desulfurization (FGD) to remove sulfur-containing gases from their stack gases. For a typical coal-fired power station, FGD will remove 95% or more of the SO2 in the flue gases. An example of FGD is the wet scrubber which is commonly used. A wet scrubber is basically a reaction tower equipped with a fan that extracts hot smoke stack gases from a power plant into the tower. Lime or limestone in slurry form is also injected into the tower to mix with the stack gases and combine with the sulfur dioxide present. The calcium carbonate of the limestone produces pH-neutral calcium sulfate that is physically removed from the scrubber. That is, the scrubber turns sulfur pollution into industrial sulfates.

In some areas the sulfates are sold to chemical companies as gypsum when the purity of calcium sulfate is high. In others, they are placed in landfill. The effects of acid rain can last for generations, as the effects of pH level change can stimulate the continued leaching of undesirable chemicals into otherwise pristine water sources, killing off vulnerable insect and fish species and blocking efforts to restore native life.

Fluidized bed combustion also reduces the amount of sulfur emitted by power production.

Vehicle emissions control reduces emissions of nitrogen oxides from motor vehicles.

International treaties

International treaties on the long-range transport of atmospheric pollutants have been agreed upon by western countries for some time now. Beginning in 1979, European countries convened in order to ratify general principles discussed during the UNECE Convention. The purpose was to combat Long-Range Transboundary Air Pollution. The 1985 Helsinki Protocol on the Reduction of Sulphur Emissions under the Convention on Long-Range Transboundary Air Pollution furthered the results of the convention. Results of the treaty have already come to fruition, as evidenced by an approximate 40 percent drop in particulate matter in North America. The effectiveness of the Convention in combatting acid rain has inspired further acts of international commitment to prevent the proliferation of particulate matter. Canada and the US signed the Air Quality Agreement in 1991. Most European countries and Canada signed the treaties. Activity of the Long-Range Transboundary Air Pollution Convention remained dormant after 1999, when 27 countries convened to further reduce the effects of acid rain. In 2000, foreign cooperation to prevent acid rain was sparked in Asia for the first time. Ten diplomats from countries ranging throughout the continent convened to discuss ways to prevent acid rain. Following these discussions, the Acid Deposition Monitoring Network in East Asia (EANET) was established in 2001 as an intergovernmental initiative to provide science-based inputs for decision makers and promote international cooperation on acid deposition in East Asia. In 2023, the EANET member countries include Cambodia, China, Indonesia, Japan, Lao PDR, Malaysia, Mongolia, Myanmar, the Philippines, Republic of Korea, Russia, Thailand and Vietnam.

Emissions trading

In this regulatory scheme, every current polluting facility is given or may purchase on an open market an emissions allowance for each unit of a designated pollutant it emits. Operators can then install pollution control equipment, and sell portions of their emissions allowances they no longer need for their own operations, thereby recovering some of the capital cost of their investment in such equipment. The intention is to give operators economic incentives to install pollution controls.

The first emissions trading market was established in the United States by enactment of the Clean Air Act Amendments of 1990. The overall goal of the Acid Rain Program established by the Act is to achieve significant environmental and public health benefits through reductions in emissions of sulfur dioxide (SO2) and nitrogen oxides (NOx), the primary causes of acid rain. To achieve this goal at the lowest cost to society, the program employs both regulatory and market based approaches for controlling air pollution.

See also
 Alkaline precipitation
 Citizen science - one of two 'first uses' of the term was in an acid rain campaign 1989.
 Gene Likens
 List of environmental issues
 Lists of environmental topics
 Ocean acidification
 Rain dust (an alkaline rain)
 Soil retrogression and degradation

References

External links

 National Acid Precipitation Assessment Program Report – a 98-page report to Congress (2005)
 Acid rain for schools
 Acid rain for schools – Hubbard Brook
 United States Environmental Protection Agency – New England Acid Rain Program (superficial)
 Acid Rain (more depth than ref. above)
 U.S. Geological Survey – What is acid rain?
 Acid Rain: A Continuing National Tragedy – a report from The Adirondack Council on acid rain in the Adirondack region (1998)
 What Happens to Acid Rain?
 Acid Rain and how it affects fish and other aquatic organisms
 Fourth Report for Policy Makers (RPM4): Towards Clean Air for Sustainable Future in East Asia through Collaborative Activities- a report for policy-makers, Acid Deposition Monitoring Network in East Asia, EANET, (2019).

Rain
Pollution
Air pollution
Water pollution
Forest pathology
Environmental chemistry
Sulfuric acid